The 1974 John Player Tournament was a women's tennis tournament played on outdoor grass courts at Devonshire Park in Eastbourne, United Kingdom. The event was part of the Women's International circuit of the 1974 WTA Tour. It was the inaugural edition of the tournament and was held from 17 June through 22 June 1974. First-seeded Chris Evert won the singles title and earned £1,750 ($4,200) first-prize money.

Finals

Singles
 Chris Evert defeated  Virginia Wade 7–5, 6–4
 It was Evert's 9th singles title of the year and the 32nd of her career.

Doubles
 Helen Gourlay /  Karen Krantzcke defeated  Chris Evert /  Olga Morozova 6–2, 6–0

References

External links
 Tournament draws

John Player Tournament
Eastbourne International
John Player Tournament
John Player Tournament
1974 in English women's sport